Cox Green Footbridge is a footbridge spanning the River Wear in North East England, linking Cox Green and Washington Staithes. The bridge opened in 1958, replacing a former ferry route.

Bridges across the River Wear
Bridges completed in 1958
Bridges in Tyne and Wear
Transport in the City of Sunderland
Pedestrian bridges in England